William Villers, 2nd Earl of Jersey (c. 1682 – 13 July 1721), known as Viscount Villiers from 1697 to 1711, was an English peer and politician from the Villiers family.

Jersey was the son of Edward Villiers, 1st Earl of Jersey, and his wife Barbara (née Chiffinch). He represented Kent in the House of Commons from 1705 to 1708. In 1711 he succeeded his father as earl.

During 1703 he travelled to Italy (Grand Tour) and he commissioned Massimiliano Soldani Benzi a bronze medal.

On 22 March 1704, William married Judith Herne, daughter of Frederick Herne and Elizabeth Lisle. They had three children:
Barbara Villiers (25 August 1706 – d. 1761), married firstly, Sir William Blackett, 2nd Baronet. She married secondly, Bussy Mansell, 4th Baron Mansell.
William Villiers, 3rd Earl of Jersey (8 March 1707 – d. 1769)
Thomas Villiers, 1st Earl of Clarendon (19 June 1709 – d. 1786)

References

External links

1680s births
1721 deaths
2
William Villiers, 02nd Earl of Jersey
English MPs 1705–1707
Members of the Parliament of Great Britain for English constituencies
British MPs 1707–1708
Earls in the Jacobite peerage
Alumni of Queens' College, Cambridge